Filippo Tallone (28 July 1902 – 13 December 1962) was an Italian sculptor. His work was part of the sculpture event in the art competition at the 1948 Summer Olympics.

References

1902 births
1962 deaths
20th-century Italian sculptors
20th-century Italian male artists
Italian male sculptors
Olympic competitors in art competitions
Artists from Turin